In computer programming, a third-party software component is a reusable software component developed to be either freely distributed or sold by an entity other than the original vendor of the development platform. The third-party software component market thrives because many programmers believe that component-oriented development improves the efficiency and the quality of developing custom applications. Common third-party software includes macros, bots, and software/scripts to be run as add-ons for popular developing software.

See also
Middleware
Enterprise Java Beans
VCL / CLX
KParts (KDE)
Video-game third-party developers
Third-party source
Online all programming languages and their third party libraries includes a guide.

References

Component-based software engineering
Computer programming